Tanoudert is a coastal town in Mauritania. It is located in the Dakhlet Nouadhibou region and forms a part of the Banc d'Arguin National Park. It is situated to a homonymous bay lying to the west and further west is Cape Tagarit (Cap-Tagair).

Nearby towns and villages include Cansado (110 km), Bir Gandus, Tichla, Akjoujt and Iouik (43 km), further south is the town of Arkeiss.

External links
Satellite map at Maplandia.com

Populated places in Mauritania
Dakhlet Nouadhibou Region
Populated coastal places in Mauritania